Agnieszka Smoczyńska (born 18 May 1978) is a Polish film and television writer and director. She is an alumnus of the Krzysztof Kieślowski Film School in Katowice. Her debut feature film  The Lure which was released in US by the Criterion Collection in 2017. It also includes the short films Aria Diva (2007) and Viva Maria! (2010). In 2022, she won Golden Lions Award at the Gdynia Film Festival for her film The Silent Twins.

Selected filmography 
 Na dobre i na złe (1999-2015) (episodes 529, 545–547, 559–560)
 Aria Diva (TV, 2007)
 Viva Maria! (2010)
 The Lure (Córki Dancingu, 2015)
 Fugue (Fuga, 2018)
 The Silent Twins (2022)

References

External links
 

1978 births
Living people
Polish film directors
Krzysztof Kieślowski Film School alumni
Polish women film directors